Ebrahim Ali (also Romanized as Ebrāhīm ‘Alī) is a village in Mosaferabad Rural District, Rudkhaneh District, Rudan County, Hormozgan Province, Iran. At the 2006 census, its population was 134, in 24 families.

References 

Populated places in Rudan County